EasyFly S.A. is a regional carrier that operates in Colombia. Its main focus is to serve intermediate cities and those not served by other carriers. Operations started in October 2007, with one British Aerospace Jetstream 41 aircraft. Its main base is El Dorado International Airport, Bogotá. Alfonso Ávila, the founder of EasyFly, was also one of the founders of Aero República in 1992.

History
The airline was founded in 2006 by Alfonso Ávila and other partners. Its first aircraft have been acquired through the leasing system. After having 9 approved routes, operations began on October 10, 2007, with only two routes: Barrancabermeja and Arauca from Bogotá.

Between November 2007 and January 2008, new routes were inaugurated to the cities of Armenia, Cartago, Yopal, Ibague and Villavicencio.

During 2010, 7 aircraft entered the fleet and in 2012, a new base was inaugurated at Ernesto Cortissoz International Airport.

In 2019, the British Aerospace Jetstream 41 left the fleet and gave way to a fleet entirely composed of ATRs.

Destinations

Codeshare agreements
Avianca

Fleet

Current fleet

The EasyFly fleet consists of the following aircraft (as of April 2022):

Former fleet
Easyfly previously operated the following aircraft:

Accidents and incidents
On March 26, 2012, EasyFly Flight 8697, a British Aerospace Jetstream 41, presented a hydraulic fluid spill during the flight. The aircraft landed without complications in José María Córdoba International Airport. The causes of the incident are being investigated.
On October 15, 2020, EasyFly Flight 9069, an ATR 42-600 (registered HK-5310) collided with a jet bridge at Palonegro International Airport. It is speculated that it was a brake failure, however the aircraft was approaching in a prohibited trajectory for this type of turboprop aircraft. According to Caracol Radio, "an irregular procedure by the pilot" caused the incident, there were no injuries.

Legal Action
In 2018 easyGroup, licensor of the easyJet brand began legal proceedings against EasyFly and Honduras-based EasySky over use of the "easy" prefix.

An unconnected Dhaka-based cargo airline, Easy Fly Express, branded as "easyFly" was also pursued by easyGroup. In April 2019, EasyGroup statement focused on this case indicated a claim against Colombia's EasyFly was ongoing.

See also
List of airlines of Colombia

References

External links

 Official website
 First picture in Airliners.net

Airlines of Colombia
Airlines established in 2006
Companies based in Bogotá
Colombian brands
Low-cost carriers
Colombian companies established in 2006